The Turtle Conservancy (TC) is a 501(c)3 organization with a focus on protecting threatened turtles and tortoises and their habitats worldwide working toward improving turtle and tortoise populations in the wild. The TC is a conservation organization protecting tortoises and freshwater turtles with work in five areas: species conservation, protection of wild lands, research science, global awareness and education, and illegal trade prevention.

The TC has supported projects to protect endangered turtles and tortoises in China, Guyana, India, Mexico, Madagascar, Nicaragua, Pakistan, South Africa, the Philippines, and the United States, and has conducted work around the world, particularly in Southeast Asia, investigating the turtle and tortoise trade.

Programs
The Turtle Conservancy's conservation strategies include habitat protection, restoration and stewardship, turtle and tortoise reintroduction and a fieldwork grant program.

Geometric tortoise - South Africa 

The geometric tortoise (Psammobates geometricus) is a small tortoise with a domed carapace and yellow and black radiating pattern. Fully grown, it reaches five to six inches. In South Africa, the Turtle Conservancy, along with its partner organizations, purchased 1,000 acres of the last remaining habitat for this critically endangered tortoise, creating the Geometric Tortoise Preserve. The TC partnered with the Cape Province wildlife agency Cape Nature and turtle biologist Dr. Margaretha Hofmeyr on two projects related to the critically endangered geometric tortoise.

Goode's thornscrub tortoise - Mexico

The Goode's thornscrub tortoise (Gopherus evgoodei) was described in 2015 by scientists Mercy Vaughn and lead author Dr. Taylor Edwards of the University of Arizona in honor of Turtle Conservancy co-founder Eric Goode. The Turtle Conservancy secured approximately 1,000 acres of tropical deciduous forest in southern Sonora, Mexico, for the protection of this newly described species. The property targeted for this land acquisition has been identified for its hospitable tortoise habitat, and for its location adjoining a nature reserve, the Reserva Monte Mojino. This project will increase the chance of the survival of numerous tortoise species and aid in restoring the rich biodiversity associated with this ecosystem. This protected area will protect the globally endangered tropical deciduous forest ecosystem supporting 36 families of tropical trees, 48 species of orchids, the highest diversity of birds in Sonora, 5 species of wild cats, and 79 species of amphibians and reptiles. The entire area will be owned and managed by Nature and Culture International, the organization that currently manages the Reserva Monte Mojino.

Bolson tortoise - Mexico

The Turtle Conservancy purchased 43,000 acres of the last remaining habitat of the Bolson tortoise (Gopherus flavomarginatus), in the state of Durango, Mexico. The largest of the North American terrestrial reptiles, this tortoise has been known to science only since 1959. The Bolson tortoise inhabits a small area of Bolsón de Mapimí in the Chihuahuan Desert of Mexico. The Mapimí Biosphere Reserve was created to protect this species, but much of this land is used for agricultural development and cattle grazing, which is threatening the tortoise's habitat. The acquisition of this land in north central Mexico will protect the tortoise along with all other native flora and fauna including an estimated 28 mammals, over 200 bird species, 5 amphibians, and 39 reptiles. The Turtle Conservancy began this effort with assistance from the Andrew Sabin Family Foundation, Josiah T. Austin, and the Desert Tortoise Council as well as the Turner Endangered Species Fund.

Ploughshare tortoise - Madagascar

In Madagascar the Turtle Conservancy collaborates with Durrell Wildlife Conservation Trust (DWCT) to protect the ed ploughshare tortoise (Astrochelys yniphora) from extinction. The Turtle Conservancy engaged in the education of local communities and in animal marking to help reduce the illegal poaching of ploughshare tortoises. In addition, the Turtle Conservancy is a member of the International Ploughshare Tortoise Working Group, which sets the direction for ploughshare tortoise conservation worldwide. Today the ploughshare tortoise is the second rarest tortoise in the world and can be sold on the black market for prices ranging from a few thousand dollars for juveniles to tens of thousands for adults. The immediate goals for the species are to stop poaching and to reclaim animals from illegal collections and place them in accredited captive breeding programs.

Palawan forest turtle - Philippines 

On the Island of Palawan in the Philippines 1,890 acres were secured for the protection of the critically endangered Palawan forest turtle. This effort is led by the Katala Foundation Inc. (KFI), with support from the Turtle Conservancy, Rainforest Trust, and Global Wildlife Conservation. The local government of Mendoza with help from the municipal government of Roxas, Palawan, designated this acreage as a protected watershed, in effect creating a wildlife protection area which will directly benefit this turtle. An additional 23 acres of land was purchased from local farmers to prevent further agricultural development and restore its original riverside rainforest habitat.

Golden coin turtle - China

The Turtle Conservancy works with Kadoorie Farm and Botanic Garden (KFBG), and the Agriculture, Fisheries and Conservation Department. to return critically endangered golden coin turtles (Cuora trifasciata) to their native habitat in southern China. These critically endangered turtles will remain on the protected grounds of KFBG as part of its Endangered Species Conservation Program, until they may be safely released into the wild. This turtle faces extinction due to the wildlife trade and the high value placed on it. Eating the animal in a jelly called guilinggao is falsely believed to promote general well-being, but it is also purported to be a cure for everything from acne to cancer. Due to these false beliefs, the golden coin turtle is one of the highest priced turtles in the trade, with prices for a single animal ranging from $10,000 to as high as $25,000. This program is the first repatriation of turtles captive-bred in another country (United States) back to their home country of China.

Diamondback terrapin - United States

The Turtle Conservancy is a proud partner of the Terrapin Nesting Project on Long Beach Island, New Jersey. The Terrapin Nesting Project is an organization founded by Kathy Lacey in 2011 with the ongoing support of the Sierra Club. The aim is to restore terrapin populations on Long Beach Island by protecting nests and releasing hatchlings back into the bay through the Adopt-a-Nest program. Visitors can adopt a nest in the spring for a nominal fee and then participate in releasing hatchlings when the nests hatch in late summer. In addition, Lacey and her team of volunteers are "re-beaching" yards with sand, replacing the decorative rock and clay yards that have displaced original nesting areas. Northern diamondback terrapins (Malaclemys terrapin terrapin) are native to the East Coast of the United States and over the past two centuries have seen their numbers dwindle. Through the effort of Lacey and her team of volunteers, terrapin numbers are on the rise. In 2017 alone, over 3,000 hatchling terrapins were released back into the wild.

Conservation Center

The Turtle Conservancy's Conservation Center is the only zoological facility dedicated to turtle and tortoises certified by the Association of Zoos and Aquariums. Founded in 2005, upon the request of John L. Behler (1943-2006), the international turtle conservationist and then curator of herpetology at the Bronx Zoo, to provide a home for the Wildlife Conservation Society's established turtle and tortoise assurance colony. These original 130 tortoises were personally escorted by Turtle Conservancy staff across the country from St. Catherine's Island, Georgia to BCC's new facility in southern California. The group included founder animals of the radiated tortoise (Astrochelys radiata) Species Survival Plan and the first recorded hatchling spider tortoises (Pyxis arachnoides) in the US. Most of these animals remain active in the BCC breeding program today.

The organization's conservation center runs breeding programs for 32 species of endangered turtles and tortoises, 12 of which are on the "Top 40 Most Endangered" list, according to the International Union for Conservation of Nature's Tortoise and Freshwater Turtle Specialist Group. The Turtle Conservancy has had success breeding a variety of species including the critically endangered Burmese star tortoise, Chaco tortoise (Chelonoidis chilensis), parrot-beaked padloper (Homopus areolatus), speckled padloper (Homopus signatus), Assam roofed turtle (Pangshura sylhetensis), Okinawa leaf turtle (Geoemyda japonica), and the impressed tortoise (Manouria impressa).

Over the past 13 years, the TC has supported researchers, ecologists, conservationists, naturalists, students, and artists. Many of the world's leading authorities on turtles and tortoises have spent time on the campus learning about the husbandry, genetics, and natural history of these animals. Many influential artists and wildlife photographers have also engaged with the collection to help promote turtle and tortoise conservation. Similarly, students from all over the world have been funded or sponsored by the Turtle Conservancy to participate in turtle and tortoise conservation.

Trade monitoring and interdiction
The global trade in turtles and tortoises for food, traditional medicine, and pets is the most serious threat to many turtles and tortoises. Poaching and the trade can cause extinction even where there is still ample habitat. The Turtle Conservancy works with TRAFFIC, the international wildlife trade monitoring group, and with governments to monitor smugglers and provide care for confiscated animals. Working closely with TRAFFIC Southeast Asia, the TC financially supports one staff member in Southeast Asia who is dedicated solely to monitoring turtles and tortoises in illegal trade routes and markets in SE Asia. TRAFFIC SE Asia has been investigating the trade in tortoises for the past ten years, including the four species originating from Madagascar.  At present, TRAFFIC is targeting five hubs in five countries—Bangkok, Jakarta, Singapore, Kuala Lumpur, and Manila—specifically to address the illegal trade activities of the four critically endangered Malagasy tortoise species, but also to monitor the trade in all threatened tortoises and freshwater turtles.

Global awareness and education
With the hope of inspiring global conservation action to save the world's turtles and tortoises, the Turtle Conservancy uses media and education in its ongoing Turtles in Crisis awareness campaign. The Turtle Conservancy shines a spotlight on the global turtle crisis through global media campaigns. Since its inception, many millions of people have heard the message. Scientific and international media outlets including CBS 60 Minutes, PBS Charlie Rose, The New Yorker, The Wall Street Journal, The New York Times, the Los Angeles Times, The Dodo, and National Public Radio have profiled the Turtle Conservancy.

The Tortoise magazine 
The Tortoise is a bi-annual publication dedicated to the appreciation and conservation of tortoises and turtles and their habitats as they relate to culture, the arts, and the global human experience.

"Turtles in Trouble" 
A report published by the Turtle Conservation Coalition calls attention to the grave conservation status of the world's tortoises and freshwater turtles. According to "Turtles in Trouble: The World’s 25+ Most Endangered Tortoises and Freshwater Turtles – 2018", more than half of the currently recognized 356 species of turtles and tortoises are threatened with extinction. Among all animals, only the nonhuman primates, with approximately 60% of species threatened with extinction, are in a more precarious state. The report updates earlier assessments, and adds two new species to the most endangered list.

Turtle Ball
The Turtle Ball is the Turtle Conservancy's annual benefit. The event's live and silent auctions  feature fine artworks from various artists, and the proceeds go to support the Turtle Conservancy's work to protect turtles and tortoises around the world.

References

External links
The Tortoise magazine
"Turtles in Trouble: The World’s 25+ Most Endangered Tortoises and Freshwater Turtles – 2018"

Environmental organizations established in 2009
Environmental organizations based in New York (state)
Turtle conservation organizations